Jeddie Schabort is a paralympic athlete from South Africa competing mainly in category T54 distance events.

Jeddie competed in both the 1992 and 1996 Summer Paralympics for South Africa.  In 1992 he competed in the 1500m, 5000m and marathon, winning a bronze medal in the marathon.  In the 1996 games he competed in the 5000m, 10000m, and marathon but was unable to add to his medal tally.

References

External links
 

Paralympic athletes of South Africa
Athletes (track and field) at the 1992 Summer Paralympics
Athletes (track and field) at the 1996 Summer Paralympics
Paralympic bronze medalists for South Africa
Living people
Year of birth missing (living people)
Medalists at the 1992 Summer Paralympics
Paralympic medalists in athletics (track and field)
South African wheelchair racers